Vlatko Pavletić (2 December 1930 – 19 September 2007) was a Croatian politician, university professor, literary critic and essayist who served as acting President of Croatia from 1999 to 2000, as well as he served as Speaker of the Croatian Parliament from 1995 to 2000. 

Pavletić was born in Zagreb, then in the Kingdom of Yugoslavia. In 1955, he graduated from the Faculty of Philosophy at the University of Zagreb, where he majored in Croatian language and literature. In 1972, he was imprisoned for a year and a half by the communist Yugoslav government as a Croatian nationalist for "attempting to destroy and change the state organization". He earned a doctorate in 1975.

Between 1990 and 1992, Pavletić served as Minister of Education under prime ministers Stjepan Mesić, Josip Manolić and Franjo Gregurić. In 1992, he was elected to the Croatian Parliament and was appointed Speaker of the Parliament on 28 November 1995. He held the post until 2000.

When President Franjo Tuđman was declared incapacitated on 26 November 1999, he automatically became acting President of Croatia. He held this office from Tuđman's death on 10 December 1999 until the Croatian Parliament elected Zlatko Tomčić as new speaker (and thus the new acting president) on 2 February 2000.

In 2004, Pavletić retired from politics. He died in Zagreb from pancreatic cancer on 19 September 2007. He was 76.

References

External links
Official website 

1930 births
2007 deaths
Burials at Mirogoj Cemetery
Politicians from Zagreb
Faculty of Humanities and Social Sciences, University of Zagreb alumni
Academic staff of the University of Zagreb
Presidents of Croatia
Speakers of the Croatian Parliament
Croatian Democratic Union politicians
Representatives in the modern Croatian Parliament
Members of the Croatian Academy of Sciences and Arts
Deaths from pancreatic cancer
Culture ministers of Croatia
Education ministers of Croatia
Deaths from cancer in Croatia